Gajisan is a mountain in Jeollanam-do, southwestern South Korea. It has an elevation of 510 metres.

See also
List of mountains of Korea

References

Mountains of South Korea
Mountains of South Jeolla Province